Tomsk-2 is a railway station in Tomsk, Russia.

Main information
The station is located in October district of Tomsk. Before the Tomsk-1 Railway station was opened, Tomsk-2 (Tomsk) station was the main station of the city.

Behind the station there is the biggest in Tomsk Oblast locomotive and coach depots.

Tomsk-2 is a terminus for passenger trains, but freight trains can go further to Tomsk-Tovarniy, Beliy Yar and Seversk.

Station building

The first station building was wooden and in 1997 a new building was open.

Trains
Only 6 trains terminate at the station:
 Tomsk — Moscow
 Tomsk — Anapa
 Tomsk — Leninogorsk
 Tomsk — Novokuznetsk
 Tomsk — Tayga
 Bely Yar — Tomsk-2

References

Railway stations in Tomsk Oblast
Railway stations in the Russian Empire opened in 1896
Buildings and structures in Tomsk